The Brahmavar Diocese is one among the 30 dioceses of the Malankara Orthodox Syrian Church. The diocese was created in August 2010 by H. H. Baselios Marthoma Didymos I. H. G. Yakob Mar Elias is the current Metropolitan of the diocese. The head office is located in Mount Horeb Bishop's House, Nanthoor, Mangalore, Karnataka

History

The diocese was created in August 2010 by H. H. Baselios Marthoma Didymos I by Kalpana no 389/2010.
It was a counsel of Malankara Association's Managing committee held on 3 August 2010 and recommended by Holy Episcopal Synod in same date.
H. G. Yakob Mar Elias became the first Metropolitan of newly formed diocese with its headquarters at Mangalore.

Features
The key feature of this diocese is the Konkani Orthodox Community and their clergy. It is the first non Keralite community in the Malankara Orthodox Church under the mission of St. Alvares Mar Julius Metropolitan of Ceylon-Goa and Rev Fr. Roque Zephrin Noronah. The diocese has parishes in Kannur (Cannanore) and Kasaragod districts of Kerala, Dakshina Kannada and Udupi (South Canara), Chickmangalore and Coorg districts in the state of Karnataka, state of Goa and in Abu Dhabi, UAE. The major languages used in the liturgy are Malayalam, Konkani, Tulu, English and Hindi.

Now

Parishes
Currently, there are 36 parishes in diocese. 16 churches in Kerala,17 churches in Karnataka, 2 in Goa, 1 in UAE. 11 parishes have more than 50 families. There are 2800 families in this diocese. The tomb of Metropolitan St. Alvares Mar Julius is situated in St. Mary Orthodox Church, Panaji. St. George Orthodox Church, Ichilampady (Georgian Pilgrim Centre), St. Mary Orthodox Cathedral, Brahmavar and St. George Orthodox Cathedral, Abu Dhabi are some of the major parishes in the diocese. There are 9 chapels under which six belong to the Konkani community and the rest belong to the Malayali communities. There are also active Konkani congregations in Mandya, Bangalore, Mumbai, Kuwait and the U.A.E. There are students ministry in the diocese.

Priests
There are 29 priests with one Cor-Episcopa and Ramban in this diocese. Teaching ministry is also a feature in this diocese.

Parish List
 01. Abu Dhabi St.George Cathedral
 02.  Arangu St. George
 03.  Ariprod St.Thomas
 04. Aravanchal St. George
 05. Birikkulam St.Gregorios
 06. Brahmavar St. Mary's Cathedral
 07. Eattukudakka St.Mary’s
 08. Hegla Mar Gregorios
 09. Ichilampady St.George
 10. Kadumeni St.George
 11. Kalanja St. Marys
 12. Karayathumchal St.Mary’s
 13. Karuvamkayam Mar Gregorios
 14. Karugunda St. George
 15. Mangalore St. Gregorios
 16. Nelliadi St. Gregorios
 17. Padangady St. Mary's
 18. Pathavu St. George
 19. Renjilady St. Thomas
 20. Kasargode St.Mary’s
 21. Kozhichal St.Mary’s
 22. Mardalam St.Mary’s
 23. Narasiharajapuram St.Mary’s
 24. Narkilakadu St.Mary’s
 25. Pakkanjikadu St.George
 26. Panaji St.Mary’s
 27. Payyavor St. Gregorios
 28. Sampiadi St.Mary’s
 29. Siddhapura St.Mary’s
 30. Thannir Panthal St.George
 31. Vanchiyam St.George
 32. Vasco-Da-Gama St.Mary’s
 33. Chuzhali St. George
 34. Manipal St. Thomas
 35. Ganganadu St. Gregorios
 36. Shivmogga St. George

Chapels. 
 1. Ammunje St. Antony
 2. Sasthan St. Thomas
 3. Kandloor St. Mary's
 4. Koorady St. Peter and St. Paul
 5. Hulikal St. Gregorios
 6. Hosangady St. George
 7. Mangodu St. George
 8. N.R Pura St. Gregorios

See also

Brahmavar (Konkani) Orthodox Church
Metropolitan Alvares Mar Julius
Saint Thomas
Baselios Mar Thoma Paulose II

References

External links
Website of Malankara Orthodox Church
Website of Brahmavar Diocese

Malankara Orthodox Syrian Church dioceses
2010 establishments in Karnataka